Raage Anuraage; was a hugely popular Bengali television Soap Opera that premiered on 28 October 2013, and aired on Zee Bangla. Produced by Raj Chakraborty Productions, starred Jeetu Kamal as main male protagonist (Mollar Sen) Anindya Chatterjee as Dr. Subhankar Roy and Tumpa Ghosh as main female protagonist and main antagonist-(Komol, Kori).

Plot summary 
This story revolved around Mollar and Komol's life. A relation of love and hatred. For some people, music is the driving force of their lives. Mollar, the angry young man and owner of a music company who have his own rules and principles get linked up with Komol who belonged to such a family where everyone loves music. 18 years old Komol learned her first lessons of music from her father. She faced the most dreaded and unfortunate incident of her life when she ended up marrying a 40 year old Mollar. Mollar falls for Komol and remarried her but they faced many hurdles and overcome them.

Cast

Main
 Jeetu Kamal as Mollar Sen(Main male Protagonist)- Komol's husband; Sreeradha's former husband; Gini, Pichku and Chini's father.
A 40 year old man who was owner of a music company where Komol used to sing in Kori's name, since she is blackmailed to do so. He married Komol, mistaking her as Kori, but he called his wife a cheater, after the discovery. However, he started falling for Komol and thus accepts her as his wife and later consummates his marriage with her.
 Tumpa Ghosh as Komol Sen(née Banerjee)(Main female Protagonist) & her twin sister Kori Roy(née Banerjee)(Main Antagonist)
 as Komol Sen- Mollar's wife; Gini, Pichku and Chini's step-mother:- She was a young girl of 18 who was an etremely talented singer and used to sing for Mollar's company. But however she faces the most unfortunate incident of her life when she ends up marrying him. Initially Mollar hated her for deceiving him, but later Mollar accepted her and she also fall in love with him too.
 as Kori Roy- Subho's wife:- She was initially jealous of her sister's singing skills. Also she tried to take away Mollar's property from him by first impersonatong as Komol, and then making him ill by giving him sleeping pills and framed Komol for the same. Also he married Subho only to save herself. But later he got caught.

Recurring 
 Arnab Banerjee / Anindya Chatterjee as Dr. Subhankar Roy aka Subho.
 Rajavi Roy as Chini, Ghini's sister
 Simron Upadhyay as Ghini, Chini's sister.
 Manasi Sinha as Meera 
 Ashmita Mukherjee as Deepti
 Sandip Chakraborty as Sumit
 Sharbani Chatterjee as Jaya
 Arijit Guha as Mahitosh Sen
 Debika Mitra as Jayanti Sen
 Rajat Ganguly as Ananda Mohon Banerjee
 Mou Bhattacharya as Gouri Banerjee
 Ambarish Bhattacharya as Prashanta Banerjee
 Lopamudra Sinha as Sandhya Banerjee
 Sourav Chatterjee as Shuddhoraag Banerjee / Shuddho
 Chhanda Karanjee Chatterjee as Ananda,  Mohon's Mother.
 Abanti Dutta as Subhankar's Mother
 Ankita Majumder as Damini
 Biplab Dasgupta as Himadri Mallick 
 Ayesha Bhattacharya as Shinjini Mallick
 Aniket Chakraborty as Shinchan Mallick
 Arpita Mukherjee as Mollar's Assistant
 Swagata Mukherjee as Jaya
 Alaknanda Roy as Jayanti Sen 
 Sushmita Dey as Sreeradha Sen
 Supriyo Dutta as Komol's Doctor
 Saurav Das as Kartik
 Mohua Haldar as Kartik's Sister
 Ronny Chakraborty as Subhankar's Brother
 Ranjini Chatterjee as Surama

Special appearance
 Anindya Chatterjee
 George Baker (actor)
 Rupankar Bagchi
 Upal Sengupta
 Usha Uthup

References

Zee Bangla original programming
2016 Indian television series debuts
Bengali-language television programming in India